Eukaryotic translation initiation factor 5A pseudogene 1, also known as EIF5AP1, is a human gene.

References

Further reading